Rockley is a small community located in Cumberland County, Nova Scotia, Canada.

References

Communities in Cumberland County, Nova Scotia